The enzyme carboxymethyloxysuccinate lyase (EC 4.2.99.12) catalyzes the chemical reaction

carboxymethyloxysuccinate  fumarate + glycolate

This enzyme belongs to the family of lyases, specifically the "catch-all" class of lyases that cleave carbon-oxygen bonds. The systematic name of this enzyme class is carboxymethyloxysuccinate glycolate-lyase (fumarate-forming). Other names in common use include carbon-oxygen lyase, and carboxymethyloxysuccinate glycolate-lyase.

References

 

EC 4.2.99
Enzymes of unknown structure